The William Shakespeare was a named train of British Railways. It only ran for a single summer, from 3 May to 8 September 1951.

Together with The Merchant Venturer, this was one of two excursions from London on the Western Region, as part of the Festival of Britain. Both of them ran from London with timings intended for a day out from the capital, to some of the cultural highlights that were the focuses of the festival. Both of them used new Mark 1 carriages painted in British Railways' carmine and cream livery.

The main section left London at 10:10 and returned from Stratford and Wolverhampton  at 19:23 and 19:50 respectively. Unusually for a named express, it was hauled on some occasions by Class 5100 tank engine, although only on the Leamington Spa to Stratord-upon-Avon part of the journey.

Service 
Although intended as a Summer service, it began earlier, with the opening of the festival at the start of May. The rest of the summer timetable did not begin until July, even later than usual, due to the austerity measures still in force.

Partly due to poor promotion, as it did not even appear in the main timetable for two months, the service was unsuccessful and only ran for four months. The Merchant Venturer was more successful, and ran for ten years, until 1961.

References 

Named passenger trains of British Rail
Railway services introduced in 1951
1951 establishments in England
1951 disestablishments in England